The Catacombs of Domitilla are an underground Christian cemetery named after the Domitilla family that had initially ordered them to be dug. They are located in Rome, Italy.  They are situated over 16 metres underground, about 2 kilometers from the south of Appia Antica (Appian Way) and span 15 kilometers in distance. They were actively used as a cemetery from the first through the fifth centuries AD and were rediscovered in 1593 by Antonio Bosio, an archaeologist They include more than 26,000 tombs. More recently, they have been restored using lasers, giving a much clearer view of the images on the walls. Unlike other Roman catacombs, these catacombs still hold the remains of humans.

Renovation 

The catacombs are composed of tufa, a form of limestone that is porous. Finishing in 2017, restorers used lasers to help restore two rooms. The restorers worked to remove layers of algae, smoke deposits, and a chalky substance. What was revealed were both pagan and Christian inspired frescoes. So far, only 12 out of about 70 rooms have been restored.

Wall paintings 

Inside the Catacombs of Domitilla are images, some of which were revealed by the restoration, reflecting the life of bakers, grape vines, Jesus with the apostles, Noah's ark, and Daniel with the lions. Other biblical figures in the various cubicula include the Virgin Mary with child, Adam, Eve, Jonah, The Good Shepherd, a young man dressed as a cardinal with apostles Peter and Paul. Non-biblical, or pagan, figures include representations of Spring and Summer in the form of females with wings, both pictured with attendants and scenes depicting Orpheus surrounded by birds, beasts and the sheep that typically accompany him. There are also other images of mythological and wild or tame beasts beyond the depictions of Orpheus.

See also
 Domitilla the Younger
 Flavia Domitilla (wife of Clemens)

References

External links

Catacombs
Flavian dynasty